This article outlines the present structure of the European Union's Common Security and Defence Policy (CSDP), a part of the Common Foreign and Security Policy (CFSP) based on articles 42–46 of the Treaty on European Union (TEU). Article 42.2 of TEU states that the CSDP includes the 'progressive framing' of a common Union defence policy, and will lead to a common defence, when the European Council of national heads of state or government, acting unanimously, so decides.

The CSDP involves military or civilian missions being deployed to preserve peace, prevent conflict and strengthen international security in accordance with the principles of the United Nations Charter. Military missions are carried out by EU forces established with contributions from the member states' armed forces. The CSDP also entails collective self-defence amongst member states as well as a Permanent Structured Cooperation (PESCO) in which 25 of the 28 national armed forces pursue structural integration. The CSDP structure, headed by the Union's High Representative (HR/VP), Josep Borrell Fontelles, comprises:
the Defence Industry Directorate-General of the European Commission
relevant sections of the External Action Service (EEAS) — including the Military Staff (EUMS) with its so-called Military Planning and Conduct Capability (MPCC)
a number of Foreign Affairs Council (FAC) preparatory bodies — such as the Military Committee (EUMC)
four agencies, including the Defence Agency (EDA)

The EU does not have a permanent military command structure along the lines of the North Atlantic Treaty Organization's (NATO) Allied Command Operations (ACO), although it has been agreed that ACO resources may be used for the conduct of the EU's CSDP missions. The MPCC, established in 2017 and to be strengthened in 2020, does however represent the EU's first step in developing a permanent military headquarters. In parallel, the newly established European Defence Fund (EDF) marks the first time the EU budget is used to finance multinational defence projects. The CSDP structure is sometimes referred to as the European Defence Union (EDU), especially in relation to its prospective development as the EU's defence arm.

Decisions relating to the CSDP are proposed by the HR/VP, adopted by the FAC, generally requiring unanimity, and then implemented by the HR/VP.

Deployment procedure
Military operations may be launched after four planning phases, through which the Operation Commander (Op. Cdr.), Military Staff (EUMS), Military Committee (EUMC), Political and Security Committee (PSC) and Council have different roles:
I: Political Framework for Crisis Approach (PFCA)
II: Crisis Management Concept (CMC)
III: Military Strategic Options (MSO, unless within CMC) and Initiating Military Directive (IMD)
IV: Concept of Operations (CONOPS), Operations Plan (OPLAN) and Rules of Engagement (ROE)

Overview

All military or civilian missions of the European Union (EU), as part of its Common Security and Defence Policy (CSDP), are planned and conducted by an operation headquarters (OHQ).

All civilian missions are directed by the Civilian Planning and Conduct Capability (CPCC), a directorate of the External Action Service (EEAS) in Brussels, Belgium.

For each military mission an OHQ is chosen. The EU does not have a permanent military command structure along the lines of the North Atlantic Treaty Organization's (NATO) Allied Command Operations (ACO), although it has been agreed that ACO resources may be used for the conduct of the EU's CSDP missions. The Military Planning and Conduct Capability (MPCC), established in 2017 and to be strengthened in 2020, does however represent the EU's first step in developing a permanent operational headquarters (OHQ).

Bodies and political leadership

High Representative

The High Representative of the Union for Foreign Affairs and Security Policy, commonly referred to as the High Representative (HR/VP), is the chief co-ordinator and representative of the EU's Common Foreign and Security Policy (CFSP), including the CSDP. The position is currently held by Josep Borrell.

Where foreign matters is agreed between EU member states, the High Representative can speak for the EU in that area, such as negotiating on behalf of the member states.

Beside representing the EU at international fora and co-ordinating the CFSP and the CSDP, the HR/VP is:
 ex-officio Vice-President of the European Commission
 participant in the meetings of the European Council
 responsible of the European Union Special Representatives
 head of the External Action Service and the delegations
 President of the Foreign Affairs Council
 Head of the European Defence Agency
 Chairperson of the board of the European Union Institute for Security Studies

European Commission
 Directorate-General for Defence Industry and Space, established in 2019

External Action Service

The European External Action Service (EEAS) is the diplomatic service and foreign and defence ministry of the EU. The EEAS is led by the HR/VP and seated in Brussels.

The EEAS does not propose or implement policy in its own name, but prepares acts to be adopted by the HR/VP, the European Commission or the Council. The EEAS is also in charge of EU diplomatic missions (delegations) and intelligence and crisis management structures.

The following EEAS bodies take part in managing the CSDP:
The Military Staff (EUMS) is an EEAS Directorate-General that provides strategic advice to the HR/VP and commands military operations through its Military Planning and Conduct Capability (MPCC) operational headquarters. The EUMS also reports to the European Union Military Committee (EUMC), representing member states' Chiefs of Defence,  and performs "early warning", situation assessment and strategic planning. The EUMS currently consists of 200+ military and civilian personnel. The EUMS and the European Defence Agency (EDA) together form the Secretariat of the Permanent Structured Cooperation (PESCO), the structural integration pursued by 25 of the 28 national armed forces of the EU since 2017.
The Intelligence and Situation Centre (EU INTCEN)
The Security and Defence College (ESDC) is a virtual institution for strategic level training. The ESDC consists of a network of various national institutions, such as defence colleges, and the European Union Institute for Security Studies. The ESDC initiated the European initiative for the exchange of young officers inspired by Erasmus, often referred to as military Erasmus, exchanging between armed forces of future military officers as well as their teachers and instructors during their initial education and training. Due to the fact that the initiative is implemented by the Member States on a purely voluntary basis, their autonomy with regard to military training is not compromised.
The Crisis Management and Planning Directorate (CMPD)
The Civilian Planning and Conduct Capability (CPCC)
The Joint Support Coordination Cell (JSCC)

Council

The Council of the European Union has the following, Brussels-based preparatory bodies in the field of CSDP:
The Political and Security Committee (PSC) consists of ambassadorial level representatives from the EU member states and usually meets twice per week. The PSC is chaired by the External Action Service. Ambassador Walter Stevens has been the PSC permanent chair since June 2013 The main functions of the PSC are keeping track of the international situation, and helping to define EU policies within the CFSP and CSDP. PSC sends guidance to, and receives advice from the European Union Military Committee (EUMC), the Committee for Civilian Aspects of Crisis Management (CIVCOM) as well as the European Union Institute for Security Studies. It is also a forum for dialogue on CSDP matters between the EU Member States. PSC also drafts opinions for the Foreign Affairs Council, which is one of the configurations of the Council of the European Union. CFSP matters are passed to the Foreign Affairs Council via COREPER II.
The European Union Military Committee (EUMC) is composed of member states' Chiefs of Defence (CHOD). These national CHODs are regularly represented in the EUMC in Brussels by their permanent Military Representatives (MilRep), who often are two- or three-star flag officers. The EUMC is under the under authority of the EU's High Representative (HR) and the Political and Security Committee (PSC). The EUMC gives military advice to the EU's High Representative (HR) and Political and Security Committee (PSC). The EUMC also oversees the European Union Military Staff (EUMS).
The Committee for Civilian Aspects of Crisis Management (CIVCOM) is an advisory body dealing with civilian aspects of crisis management. The activities of CIVCOM therefore forms part of the Common Foreign and Security Policy (CFSP) of EU, and the civilian side of the Common Security and Defence Policy (CSDP). CIVCOM is composed of representatives of the EU member states. The activities of CIVCOM for civilian CSDP tasks occur in parallel to the European Union Military Committee (EUMC) for military CDP tasks. Both EUMC and CIVCOM receive directions from, and report to the Political and Security Committee (PSC). The decision to establish CIVCOM was taken in 2000 by the Council of the European Union.
The Politico-Military Group (PMG) carries out preparatory work for the Political and Security Committee (PSC). It covers the political aspects of EU military and civil-military issues, including concepts, capabilities and operations and missions. The tasks of the PMG include: 1) preparing Council conclusions and provides recommendations for the PSC, and monitoring their effective implementation 2) contributing to the development of horizontal policy and facilitating information exchanges. The PMG has a particular responsibility regarding partnerships with non-EU countries and other organisations, including EU-NATO relations, as well as exercises. The PMG is chaired by a representative of the HR/VP.

Agencies

The following agencies relate to the CSDP:
The Defence Agency (EDA), based in Brussels, facilitates the improvement of national military capabilities and integration. In that capacity, it makes proposals, coordinates, stimulates collaboration, and runs projects.
The Border and Coast Guard Agency (Frontex), based in Warsaw, Poland, leads the European coast guard that controls the borders of the Schengen Area.
The Institute for Security Studies (ISS), based in Paris, is an autonomous think tank that researches EU-relevant security issues. The research results are published in papers, books, reports, policy briefs, analyses and newsletters. In addition, the institute convenes seminars and conferences on relevant issues that bring together EU officials, national experts, decision-makers and NGO representatives from all Member States.
The Satellite Centre (SatCen), located in Torrejón de Ardoz, Spain, supports the decision-making by providing products and services resulting from the exploitation of relevant space assets and collateral data, including satellite and aerial imagery, and related services.

Permanent structured cooperation

The Permanent Structured Cooperation (PESCO) is the framework in which 25 of the 28 national armed forces pursue structural integration. Based on Article 42.6 and Protocol 10 of the Treaty on European Union, introduced by the Treaty of Lisbon in 2009, PESCO was first initiated in 2017. The initial integration within the PESCO format is a number of projects planned to launch in 2018.

PESCO is similar to enhanced co-operation in other policy areas, in the sense that integration does not require that all EU member states participate.

Funding of missions

Defence industry coordination and research funding

The European Defence Fund is an EU-managed fund for coordinating and increasing national investment in defence research and improve interoperability between national forces. It was proposed in 2016 by President Jean-Claude Juncker and established in 2017 to a value of €5.5 billion per year. The fund has two stands; research (€90 million until the end of 2019 and €500 million per year after 2020) and development & acquisition (€500 million in total for 2019–20 then €1 billion per year after 2020).

Together with the Coordinated Annual Review on Defence and Permanent Structured Cooperation it forms a new comprehensive defence package for the EU.

EU-developed infrastructure for military use includes:
European Secure Software-defined Radio
Galileo (satellite navigation)

See also
Structure of NATO

Notes

References

Further reading
European Defence (2019), European Court of Auditors

Military of the European Union
Bodies of the European Union